Terrat is  an administrative ward in the  Arusha Urban District located in the Arusha Region of Tanzania. Not to be confused with Terrat ward in Simanjiro, Manyara region.  According to the 2012 census, the ward has a total population of 21,790.

References

Wards of Arusha City
Wards of Arusha Region